"Breaking Us in Two" is a song by British musician Joe Jackson.  It was the third of three charting singles from his 1982 LP, Night and Day.

The single was released in the UK on 13 August 1982, backed with a song called "El Blanco", which was simply Jackson's song "Target" sung in Spanish. In the US, the B-side was the regular English version of "Target". The single began to get radio airplay in late 1982 and early 1983, especially in the US where the music video was in medium rotation on MTV in early February. By mid-March the single had become a hit in the US, reaching number 18 on the Billboard Hot 100. Later, it reached number 40 in Canada. It also charted in the UK and Australia.  It was a bigger Adult Contemporary hit, reaching number eight in the U.S. and number 12 in Canada.

Billboard said it was "jazzy and precise [and] similar in tone to the top 10 'Steppin' Out'."

The music video was filmed on location in and around the Oakworth railway station in England.

Chart history

Weekly charts

Year-end charts

References

External links
 

1982 songs
1983 singles
Joe Jackson (musician) songs
Songs written by Joe Jackson (musician)
A&M Records singles
1980s ballads
Pop ballads